Choristes may refer to:
 The Chorus (2004 film), a film whose French title is Les Choristes
 a synonym for the plant genus Deppea
 a synonym for the sea snail genus Amauropsis

See also 
 Emarginula choristes, a species of sea snails